Thomas Moloughney (23 October 1940 – 6 March 2021) was an Irish hurler who played at club level with Kilruane MacDonagh's and at inter-county level with Tipperary.

Career

Born in Ardcroney, Moloughney was a member of the Kilruane MacDonagh's club. Having never played minor at inter-county level, he first played for Tipperary in a National League game against Galway in October 1959 after impressive club displays. After claiming the league title, McLoughney's debut season ended with him collecting the first of three successive Munster Championship medals. After losing the 1960 All-Ireland final to Wexford, Tipperary went on to claim the following two titles, with Moloughney lining out in the full-forward line in both those victories. His last appearance came as a substitute in the 1963 National League final.

Having never won a County Championship title during his own playing days, Moloughney served as a selector when Kilruane MacDonagh's won three successive titles between 1977 and 1979. He also served as a selector with the Tipperary senior team for a number of seasons.

Honours

Player

Kilruane MacDonaghs
North Tipperary Senior Hurling Championship: 1959, 1965

Tipperary
All-Ireland Senior Hurling Championship: 1961, 1962
Munster Senior Hurling Championship: 1960, 1961, 1962
National Hurling League: 1959–60, 1960–61

Selector

Kilruane MacDonaghs
Tipperary Senior Hurling Championship: 1977, 1978, 1979

References

1940 births
2021 deaths
Kilruane MacDonaghs hurlers
Tipperary inter-county hurlers
All-Ireland Senior Hurling Championship winners
Hurling selectors